Kudarkot is a town in Auraiya district in the Indian state of Uttar Pradesh.

Cities and towns in Auraiya district